This is a list of Pakistani films released in 2015. Jawani Phir Nahi Ani was the all time grossing Pakistani film released on EidulAzha this year, replaced by Punjab Nahi Jaungi released on  Eid ul Azha 2017.

Highest-grossing films
 
The top 10 films released in 2015 by worldwide gross are as follows:

Events

Award ceremonies

Film Festivals

Releases

January – March

April – June

July – September

See also
 2015 in film
 2015 in Pakistan

References

External links
 Search Pakistani film - IMDB.com

2015
Lists of 2015 films by country or language
Films